Chocrón is a surname. Notable people with the surname include:

Isaac Chocrón (1930–2011), Venezuelan economist, playwright, and translator
Sonia Chocrón (born 1961), Venezuelan poet, novelist, screenwriter, and playwright, relative of Isaac